West Chelmsford was a parliamentary constituency represented in the House of Commons of the Parliament of the United Kingdom. From 1997 to 2010 it elected one Member of Parliament (MP) by the first past the post system of election.

History
This seat was created for the 1997 general election from parts of the abolished Chelmsford and part of the Braintree constituency. It was abolished at the next redistribution which came into effect for the 2010 general election, when the Chelmsford constituency was re-established.

It was a safe Conservative seat throughout its existence.

Boundaries
The Borough of Chelmsford wards of All Saints, Boreham, Broomfield, Pleshey and Great Waltham, Cathedral, Chignall, Good Easter, Mashbury, Highwood and Roxwell, Goat Hall, Great and Little Leighs and Little Waltham, Margaretting and Stock, Moulsham Lodge, Old Moulsham, Patching Hall, St. Andrews, Springfield North, Springfield South, The Lawns, Waterhouse Farm and Writtle.

The seat took in northern and western parts of the abolished constituency of Chelmsford including by far the majority of the city itself. It also included rural areas extending as far north as Great Leighs, the Walthams and Good Easter, which had previously been part of the Braintree constituency.

At the 2010 general election, a newly re-created Chelmsford constituency (now a Borough Constituency) succeeded this seat. Rural wards from this constituency mainly joined the Saffron Walden constituency, with a small area around Margaretting becoming part of the Maldon constituency.

Members of Parliament

Elections

Elections in the 1990s

Elections in the 2000s

See also
 List of parliamentary constituencies in Essex

Notes and references

Parliamentary constituencies in Essex (historic)
Constituencies of the Parliament of the United Kingdom established in 1997
Constituencies of the Parliament of the United Kingdom disestablished in 2010
Politics of the City of Chelmsford